Gahar Lake is a lake found in the highlands of Iran, and is located in the southeast of Dorud  among Oshtrankooh in Lorestan province protected zone at the height of 2400 meters above the sea level. The lake is known as the jewel of Oshtarankooh and due to the lack of roads and lower use of cars and automobiles, it is basically free from being damaged and polluted by humans. About 70,000 tourists visit the area annually.

Geographical location

Ownership 
During the past several years, tensions over the ownership of the lake has been raised by the cities around it, which a lawsuit has been sent by the Dorud city's governor and municipality to the Ministry of Interior. In response to the lawsuit, the Ministry of Interior sent a letter with a map and geographical location of Gahar Lake to the neighboring governorates and municipalities of Dorud, reminding them that the lake is completely located in the territory of Dorud city, and it belongs to the city.

Gahar consists of two parts. It includes upper Gahar (the small one), and the lower Gahar (the big one) lakes. The upper Gahar is about 1700 meters long, 400 to 800 meters wide, and 4 to 28 meters deep. The shore of this lake, except for the entrance part of the lake (west side) and the opposite part (east side), which has a sandy shore and is suitable for swimming, has a rocky shore that is not suitable for swimming.  At the lower and upper parts of the lake, there is a dense forest that is on the verge and danger of extinction. From the top, blue water flows into the lake, which continues to other lakes. It takes about 40 minutes to walk to from the upper Gahar to the lower Gahar. The depth of the lake is shallow therefore you can see the fish at the bottom of the lake clearly.

The inflow of the lake water is 10 cubic feet per second and the outflow is about 20 cubic feet per second. The reason for the increase in the volume of water leaving the lake is the presence of springs in its lower part. The main water supply of the lake is through its creek, Tapleh River, which has a very cool, clear, and sparkling water with a bed full of pebbles and stones, which enters the lower lake without falling and with a little acceleration it enters the upper lake after a short expanse.

Rainfall in the region 
Annual rainfall in Gohar region is about 933 mm, which is mostly snowfall. During the snowy years, the surface of the lake freezes.

Vegetation

The vegetation of this region includes trees and plants such as oak, willow, almond, terebinth (wild pistachio), European pear, plane trees, elm, quercus infectoria, walnut, fig, European ash, apple, hawthorn, prunus dulcis, Gahar’s ziziphus spina-christi, pomegranate, gaz, and vinifera (wild grapes). Flowers include: Fritillaria, anemone, lily, tulip, amaranth, and Indian shot.

History 

Most Europeans and tourists know this lake as Iran Lake, which is the result of the introduction of an English woman named Isabella Lucy Bishop, who in 1890 was able to explore the area for 3 months and walk a thousand kilometers, but according to documents historically, the first person to discover Lake Gahar was an Austrian geologist named A-Rudler, who in 1888 made history as the discoverer of Lake Gahar.

When he discovered the lake, he had walked from the heights of Oshtarankooh in Dorud. The first and oldest documentary image of the lake was taken in 1891, belonging to a French tourist named Jean-Jacques Dumergané.

Formation 
Gahar Lake was most likely caused and formed by a large earthquake. The lake is located on the main fault of modern Zagros; Therefore, a landslide is probably formed as a result of fault movement and event.

References 

Lakes of Iran